Cita en las estrellas  (Spanish for "Date in the stars") is a 1949 Argentine fantasy screwball comedy film directed by Carlos Schlieper, and starring María Duval and Juan Carlos Thorry. It was produced by Kurt Land and released by film studio Emelco. Set in Mar del Plata, the film tells the story of two lovers that are separated by death, and their desperate attempts to reunite in Heaven. The screenplay was written by Alejandro Verbitzky and Emilio Villalba Welsh.

Plot 

Alicia returns from Paris to the city of Mar del Plata, where she is reunited with her childhood friend and youth lover, Luis. They go out to dinner along with their respective spouses: Julio, a close friend of Luis, and Carmen. Upon seeing each other again, Alicia and Luis confess that they are still in love with each other and, the following night, meet privately and agree to just be friends. While returning from this meeting, they suffer a car accident that causes the death of Luis and leaves Alicia in a delicate state. While being operated by Luis' uncle, a renowned doctor, Alicia loses her life and arrives in Heaven, where she reunites with Luis. Since their marriages on Earth have ended by their deaths, they marry each other in Heaven. However, the doctor manages to revive Alicia and she ends up surviving the operation, returning to her earthly life.

Following her recovery, Alicia refuses to recognize Julio as her husband, insisting that she had married Luis in Heaven. She wants to die in order to meet Luis again, although she cannot commit suicide as it would prevent her from entering Heaven. Alicia then decides to put herself in risky situations, seeking to suffer a fatal accident. Meanwhile, Luis discovers that natural accidents are controlled from Heaven, and sends a landslide while Alicia and Julio are climbing a mountain. Luis does not fulfill his mission, and only causes the death of Julio, with whom he argues in Heaven about who is Alicia's legitimate husband. Alicia visits a spiritist medium and manages to communicate with Luis, telling him that they will soon meet again.

After learning that Alicia was taking a flight to Paris alongside Carmen, Luis sends another accident. However, Alicia decides not to take the plane at the last minute, and Carmen arrives in Heaven instead. Seeking to return to Earth, Luis breaks the rules of Heaven but only manages to be punished with temporary isolation. A longing Alicia approaches the seaside, hoping that fate will lead her to death. While standing on the waterfront street, she is almost run over by Jorge Rigaud, a famous actor. Alicia reacts enthusiastically when she sees that the man physically resembles Luis, says the same compliments, and even has the same favorite song as him. In Heaven, Carmen and Julio celebrate while Luis screams in despair as they watch Alicia get into Jorge's car and drive away.

Cast
 María Duval as Alicia
 Juan Carlos Thorry as Luis
 Osvaldo Miranda as Julio
 Héctor Calcaño as Luis' uncle
 Alberto Bello as Heaven's manager
 Analía Gadé as Carmen
 Jorge Rigaud as himself 
 Alba Mujica as the spiritist

Style 
The film's style has been described as "unclassifiable". Critic Fernando Martín Peña felt that Cita en las estrellas "surprises above all because it is a unique film in Argentine cinema [...] due to its lack of prejudice, its awareness of common places and its way of using that awareness to benefit a humor that today we would call postmodern."

Reception
The film was well received by critics, with newspaper La Nación commending its narrative. Some elements of the film were compared to Henry Hathaway's Peter Ibbetson.

References

External links
 
 
 

1940s screwball comedy films
1949 films
1940s Spanish-language films
Argentine black-and-white films
1949 romantic comedy films
Films directed by Carlos Schlieper
Argentine romantic comedy films